Power Stone is a 3D fighting game made by Capcom. Power Stone was initially released on the Sega NAOMI hardware and later ported to the Dreamcast. In October 2006, Capcom ported the game and its sequel Power Stone 2 to the PlayStation Portable as Power Stone Collection. An anime TV series based on the game ran in 1999 from April 3 to September 25.

Gameplay

Gameplay involves selecting a character and then proceeding to battle the other characters, one at a time, in various locales. The three-dimensional fighting includes the ability to use special attacks as well as to pick up and fight with such objects as tables, chairs, rocks and bombs. During battle, "Power Stones", resembling gems of different colors, appear in the arena. If a character collects three Power Stones, they transform into a more powerful version of themself. The character will then be able to use one of two super special attacks: generally a massive long-range power attack and a grab or close-range move. The powered-up mode only lasts until the power bar is fully drained, during which the special attack can be executed (which completely depletes the power bar) or other, lesser special moves can be executed (which only use a small portion of power). Each match continues until the life bar of one of the two characters fighting is depleted.

Plot
Set in the 19th century, strong believers of legends, myths and superstition search for fame, fortune and glory. One legend above all is sought after by many, a treasure which can make any dream come true. Believers from all over the world set out to search for this treasure, and are forced to fight against one another in pursuit of the legendary Power Stone.

Characters
There are 10 characters in the original Power Stone:
 is the main character of Power Stone. Aged 21 and weighing , Fokker measures  and has a fighting style of boxing. He is the son of Pride Falcon (Pride Fokker in Japan), who is playable in Power Stone 2 after unlocking him. He is from Londo (a reference to London). When in Power Change, he is known as the Red Whirlwind. Falcon's Japanese name is a reference to the Fokker, the plane he is seen in. This was possibly removed in the English version because of the inappropriate puns that would follow. His Power Change is a similar hybrid to Iron Man.
 is an aspiring chef and martial-artist from the town of Tong-An. Wang-Tang is age 19, weighs , measures . When Wang-Tang picks up an item, he says "lucky", where the other characters in Power Stone speak Japanese. Wang-Tang's Power Fusions resemble moves from a Super Saiyan from the Dragon Ball series, including moves based on Goku's Kamehameha and Spirit Bomb. He is known as the Agile Dragon when in Power Change.
 is from the town of Mutsu (reference to Mutsu). Ryoma is age 19, weighs , measures . When in Power Change, he is known as the Master Swordsman which could be seen as a composite of the Silver Samurai and the Ronin Warriors.
 is a travelling entertainer and kunoichi from the town of Oedo (reference to Edo). Ayame is age 16, weighs , measures . Her power drives and fusions involve shurikens. When in Power Change, she is known as the Cherry Blossom Dancer.
 is a fortune teller from the town of Mahdad (reference to Baghdad). Rouge is age 23, weighs , measures  and has a Gypsy Dancing fighting style. When in Power Change, she is known as the Scorching Beauty. Her design looks similar to Pullum from the Street Fighter EX series.
 is a mysterious man whose body is covered in bandages. It is rumored that he could be around 40 years old, but the anime has mentioned he is over 100 years old. He weighs , measures , and has an original fighting style. He and Ryoma are the only two characters in the original Power Stone who wield a weapon. Jack is from the town of Manches (reference to Manchester). He is likely a reference to Jack the Ripper (a paper in his ending calls him "Jack the Slayer"). When in Power Change, he is known as the Mad Clown.
 is from the town of Dawnvolta. He is age 38, weighs , measures . When in Power Change, he is known as the Heavy Tank which bears a resemblance to The Thing from Marvel Comic's Fantastic Four. He shares a name with a character from Capcom's Saturday Night Slam Masters.
 is from the town of Dullstown. Galuda is age 34, weighs , measures . When in Power Fusion, he is known as the Proud Eagle, in which he looks similar to a totem pole. His appearance is similar to that of T. Hawk from the game Super Street Fighter II.
 is a pirate from Power Stone. He, like Valgas, is an unlockable character. Kraken is from a pirate ship in Skull Haven. Kraken's age is unknown, weighs , measures  and has a buccaneer fighting style. When in Power Change, he is known as Ghost Pirate. His name is a reference to the kraken, along with his nickname, King Octopus.
 is a character from Power Stone. He is from the island of Avalon Island. Valgas's age is unknown, weighs , measures  and has a wrestling fighting style. He is a very powerful character and is quite fast. When defeated, he transforms into the final boss of the game, Final Valgas. His name may be a reference to Vulgus, Capcom's first game.

Reception

In Japan, Game Machine listed Power Stone on their May 1, 1999 issue as being the eighteenth most-successful arcade game of the month.

In the USA, Blake Fischer reviewed the Dreamcast version of the game for Next Generation, rating it five stars out of five, and stated that "every Dreamcast owner should have this title. It's unique, it's fast, and most importantly, it's loads of fun".

The Dreamcast version of Power Stone received "favorable" reviews according to video game review aggregator GameRankings. However, Power Stone Collection received "average" reviews according to video game review aggregator Metacritic. In Japan, Famitsu gave the former console version a score of 34 out of 40. In the UK, Computer and Video Games gave it a full 5-star rating, stating that "it's fantastic".

Legacy
A sequel was released in 2000 called Power Stone 2, which featured the original cast (minus the hidden characters Kraken and Valgas) as well as several new characters.

The sequel features the same three dimensional combat system, but now allows up to four players to play simultaneously. There are new maps, some of which contain multiple areas and moving sections. The sequel also features an entirely new arsenal of weapons, from futuristic handguns to gigantic mallets, and magic wands to vehicles. Players can collect these items in a special "Adventure" mode; they can then be traded at a special "Item Shop", or combined to form new items.

A remake of the two games was released for the PSP in 2006 under the name Power Stone Collection. This collection contains slightly updated versions of both games (Dreamcast versions) on one UMD. The PSP version of the original Power Stone included the four new characters introduced in Power Stone 2.

A lone Power Stone Manga from KC BomBom Comic was issued on 15 March 1999. The anime is mostly based on this and the previewed graphics can be found in Dreamcast official site.

References

External links
 
 
 Power Stone entry at Sega-Naomi
 

1999 video games
Fighting games
Platform fighters
3D fighting games
Arcade video games
Cancelled Panasonic M2 games
Capcom games
Capcom franchises
Dreamcast games
Gemstones in fiction
Video games about ninja
PlayStation Portable games
Video games adapted into television shows
Video games developed in Japan
Video games scored by Tetsuya Shibata
Video games set in the 19th century
Multiplayer and single-player video games